Winfield Scott Moore III (December 27, 1931 – June 28, 2016) was an American guitarist who formed The Blue Moon Boys in 1954, Elvis Presley's backing band. He was studio and touring guitarist for Presley between 1954 and 1968.

Rock critic Dave Marsh credits Moore with inventing power chords, on the 1957 Elvis hit "Jailhouse Rock", the intro of which Moore and drummer D.J. Fontana, according to the latter, "copped from a '40s swing version of 'The Anvil Chorus"." Moore was ranked 29th in Rolling Stone magazine's list of 100 Greatest Guitarists of All Time in 2011. He was inducted into the Rock and Roll Hall of Fame in 2000, the Musicians Hall of Fame and Museum in 2007, and the Memphis Music Hall of Fame in 2015. Rolling Stones' lead guitarist Keith Richards said of Moore:When I heard "Heartbreak Hotel", I knew what I wanted to do in life. It was as plain as day. All I wanted to do in the world was to be able to play and sound like the way Scotty Moore did. Everyone wanted to be Elvis, I wanted to be Scotty.

Biography

Winfield Scott Moore III was born near Gadsden, Tennessee, to Mattie (née Hefley) as the youngest of four boys by 14 years. He learned to play the guitar from family and friends at age eight. Although underage when he enlisted, Moore served in the United States Navy in China and Korea from 1948 through January 1952.

Moore's early background was in jazz and country music. A fan of the guitarist Chet Atkins, Moore led a group called the Starlite Wranglers before Sam Phillips at Sun Records put him together with then-teenage Elvis Presley. The trio was completed with double bass player Bill Black, who brought a "rhythmic propulsion" that much pleased Phillips. In 1954, Moore and Black accompanied Elvis on what would become the first Presley hit, the Sun Studios session cut of "That's All Right", a recording regarded as a seminal event in rock and roll history.

This session, held on the evening of July 5, 1954, proved entirely unfruitful until late in the night. As they were about to give up and go home, Presley took his guitar and launched into a 1946 blues number, Arthur Crudup's "That's All Right". Moore recalled,All of a sudden, Elvis just started singing this song, jumping around and acting the fool and then Bill picked up his bass and he started acting the fool too, and I started playing with them. Sam, I think, had the door to the control booth open...he stuck his head out and said, "What are you doing?" And we said, "We don't know." "Well, back up," he said, "try to find a place to start and do it again." Phillips quickly began taping as this was the sound he had been looking for.During the next few days, the trio recorded a bluegrass number, Bill Monroe's "Blue Moon of Kentucky", again in a distinctive style and employing a jury-rigged echo effect that Sam Phillips dubbed to be "slapback". A single was pressed with "That's All Right" on the A side and "Blue Moon of Kentucky" as the B-side.

Phillips' rhythm-centered vision led him to steer Moore away from Chet Atkins style, the one which had been adopted by Merle Travis' finger-picking style, now dubbed as "travis picking", which he deemed fine for pop or country but not for the simple, gutsy sound Phillips was aiming at. Simplify was the keyword.

By his performance at the Louisiana Hayride in October 1954, Presley, Black and Moore were called the Blue Moon Boys.

For a time, Moore served as Presley's personal manager. They were later joined by the drummer D.J. Fontana. 

Beginning in July 1954, the Blue Moon Boys toured and recorded throughout the American South. Subsequently, Elvis' popularity rose amongst teenage girls, they began touring nationwide, appearing on distinguished shows like The Ed Sullivan Show, which, at the time, was the hallmark for success for young artists. On April 3 of that year, they performed Shake, Rattle and Roll," "Heartbreak Hotel," and "Blue Suede Shoes" on The Milton Berle Show. Elvis and the band appeared on The Steve Allen Show in a comedy sketch performing "Hound Dog" to an actual hound dog. Presley was prohibited from doing the gyrations that elicited screams from the audience, which would produce good reviews, but those reviews were nothing compared to the scandals they would face thanks to Elvis. Elvis never understood why the girls screamed out of control when he sang. It was Moore who told him why. "It's your leg, man. The way you shake your left leg." Elvis Presley: The Early Years | Mississippi History Now

Moore played on many of Presley's most famous recordings, including "That's All Right," "Good Rockin' Tonight," "Milkcow Blues Boogie," "Baby Let's Play House" (where Elvis introduced the vocal stutter to the music pundits), "Heartbreak Hotel," "Mystery Train," "Blue Suede Shoes," "Hound Dog," "Too Much,""Jailhouse Rock," and "Hard Headed Woman." He called his solo on "Hound Dog" "ancient psychedelia."

During the filming and recording of Loving You in Hollywood in early 1957, Moore and Black drove boredom away by jamming with Presley between takes but they usually saw little of Presley, although he stayed only a couple of floors away from them. They grew hurt and resentful at the separation, which they came to perceive as willfully organized.

They did not accompany Presley on the soundtrack recordings for his first movie, Love Me Tender, because 20th Century Fox had refused to allow him to use his own band, with the excuse that the band could not play country. By December 1956, they were experiencing financial difficulties because there had been few performances since August.   When there were performances, they received $200 a week (US$ in  dollars), but only $100 (US$ in  dollars) when there were not performing. Moore and his wife were forced to move in with her three sisters and brother-in-law. In an interview with the Memphis Press-Scimitar that December, they spoke about their lack of performances and contact with Presley himself. The interview was the vehicle for their announcement that management had given them permission to record an instrumental album of their own, which RCA Victor would release, permission which was needed in order for them appear as a group without Presley.

During Presley's 1957 tour of Canada, the concert promoter Oscar Davis offered to represent them as their manager. Moore and Black, who had seen Presley become a millionaire while they were still earning $200 or $100 a week themselves, were willing to work with Davis but the backing vocalists, the Jordanaires, were not amenable, because they did not trust Davis. They had usually been living off $100 a week since 1956, as has Elvis, however, once Hollywood had been introduced, Presley's salary experienced a dramatic rise, while Moore and Black continued at $100 a week.  They only received one raise in two years and with the lack of personal appearances it was getting to be too financially difficult.

Tension hit a breaking point right after the September 1957 sessions for Presley's first Christmas album. Moore and Black had been promised an opportunity to jam with Elvis after the session, on Presley's studio time. Yet when the session was over, they were told to pack up and leave. That same evening, the duo wrote a letter of resignation.  

They deduced (correctly) the Colonel was working against them. They had been denied virtually all access to Presley and felt as if "they were no longer even permitted to talk to him.” Colonel Parker didn't interfere but RCA Victor executive Steve Sholes, who had little regard for the ability of Presley's band, hoped the separation would be permanent. Back in Memphis, a journalist found out about the split and interviewed the duo. Presley responded to the article with a press statement wishing them good luck, saying things could have been worked out if they had come to him first instead of bringing it to the press. In an accompanying interview, Presley revealed that during the previous two years, people had tried to convince him to get rid of his band so from his point of view he had stayed loyal to them.

Presley was scheduled to appear in Tupelo within the next two weeks and started to audition new musicians. He performed with Hank Garland on guitar and D.J. Fontana's friend, Chuck Wiginton, on bass, but despite their musical ability, it didn't feel the same to him. The week after his Tupelo engagement he hired back Moore and Black on a per diem basis. In the meantime, the duo had played "a miserable two-week engagement at the Dallas State Fair." Moore declared there were no hard feelings, though Presley himself, according to biographer Guralnick, seems to have taken a more melancholic view. One day, Guralnick writes, Presley heard "Jailhouse Rock" on the radio "and declared, 'Elvis Presley and his one-man-band,' with a rueful shake of his head."

Moore and the Blue Moon Boys performed (and had additional small walk-on and speaking roles) with Presley in four of his movies (Loving You, Jailhouse Rock, King Creole, and G.I. Blues) filmed in 1957, 1958, and 1960.

Early in 1958, when Presley was drafted, Moore began working at Fernwood Records and produced a hit record, "Tragedy," for Thomas Wayne Perkins, the brother of Johnny Cash's guitarist Luther Perkins. 

In 1960, Moore commenced recording sessions with Presley at RCA Victor and also served as production manager at Sam Phillips Recording Service, which involved supervising all aspects of studio operation. Moore played on such Presley songs as "Fame and Fortune," "Such a Night," "Frankfort Special," "Surrender," "I Feel So Bad," "Rock-a-Hula Baby," "Kiss Me Quick," "Good Luck Charm," "She's Not You," "(You're The) Devil in Disguise," and "Bossa Nova Baby." Moore remained as a guitarist for the majority of the songs recorded after Presley's work was dominated by Hollywood sessions. Moore mostly played rhythm guitar, however, with his last lead guitar work occurring by 1962 with "(You're The) Devil in Disguise." Moore also played on sessions for Roy Orbison (most notably on “Crying”) and others.

In 1964, Moore released a solo album on Epic Records called The Guitar That Changed the World, played using his Gibson Super 400.  Phillips was initially unaware of the project, and once he got wind of it, Moore was fired. He reunited with Fontana and Presley for the NBC television special known as the '68 Comeback Special, again with his Gibson Super 400, which was also played by Presley. This special was the last time these musicians would play with Presley, and for Moore, it was the last time he ever saw him.

Style and influence
Moore's playing on his Gibson with his unique finger-picking style using a thumbpick, as on the Sun and early RCA Victor recordings, represented a move of the Chet Atkins style into a more rockabilly mode.

Of Presley's first single "That's All Right," the critic Dave Marsh wrote that "Moore's guitar—especially the solo—toughens the song up and forces it to rock." Though Marsh credits Presley with introducing "the vocal stutter" on "Baby Let's Play House," Marsh states, "Other than that, it's guitarist Scotty Moore's show and he sets a few precedents of his own." Of the other Sun recordings, Marsh cited the "urgent Scotty Moore guitar lick" as a standout element of "Mystery Train," while "Good Rockin' Tonight" displays his "stinging guitar." 

In Marsh's description, the teamwork of Moore and other musicians turned the 1957 single and movie title song "Jailhouse Rock" into an "enduring smash for at least three reasons: the great walking bass, Scotty Moore's invention of power chording, and D.J. Fontana's drumming, which is halfway between strip joint rhumba and the perfect New Orleans shuffle."

On the 1961, post-Army Presley single "Little Sister," "Scotty Moore comes up with his greatest post-Sun guitar lick and not only converts a comparatively humdrum Pomus-Shuman teen love triangle number into the best of Elvis's early sixties hits but (together with D.J. Fontana's heavy-footed thunderation) gives more than a few pointers toward the metallic rock to come." According to Presley discographer Ernst Jorgensen, however, Hank Garland was the lead guitarist on the song, while Moore played acoustic guitar.

Moore is given credit as a pioneer rock 'n' roll lead guitarist, though he characteristically downplayed his own innovative role in the development of the style. "It had been there for quite a while," recalled Moore. "Carl Perkins was doing basically the same sort of thing up around Jackson and I know for a fact Jerry Lee Lewis had been playing that kind of music ever since he was ten years old." Paul Friedlander describes the defining elements of rockabilly, which he similarly characterizes as "essentially... an Elvis Presley construction:" "the raw, emotive, and slurred vocal style and emphasis on rhythmic feeling [of] the blues with the string band and strummed rhythm guitar [of] country." In "That's All Right," the Presley trio's first record, Moore's guitar solo, "a combination of Merle Travis–style country finger-picking, double-stop slides from acoustic boogie and blues-based bent-note, single-string work, is a microcosm of this fusion."

Although some lead guitarists and vocalists, such as Chuck Berry and the blues legend BB King, had gained popularity by the 1950s, Presley rarely played his own lead while performing, instead providing rhythm guitar and leaving the lead duties to Moore. As a guitarist, Moore was a noticeable presence in Presley's performances despite his introverted demeanor. He became an inspiration to many subsequent popular guitarists, including George Harrison, Jeff Beck, and Keith Richards of the Rolling Stones. While Moore was working on his memoir with co-author James L. Dickerson, Richards told Dickerson, "Everyone else wanted to be Elvis—I wanted to be Scotty." Richards has stated many times (in Rolling Stone magazine and in his autobiography, Life) that he could never figure out how to play the "stop time" break and figure that Moore played on "I'm Left, You're Right, She's Gone" (Sun) and that he hopes it will remain a mystery.

Equipment
Earlier on, Scotty used a '52 Telecaster, which he traded at the Houck Piano Company in Memphis for the now-iconic gold-colored Gibson ES-295 (nicknamed "The Guitar That Changed the World"). He made some modifications to the guitar, mainly he was unhappy with the Les Paul style bridge, which he replaced with a Melita-Synchro Sonic model with adjustable saddles, which enabled fine-tuning of each string; but this bridge further required a different tailpiece--Scotty opted for a Kluson trapeze model as utilized by Gibson on the ES-125. This is the guitar heard on all but the later Sun sessions with Elvis. In July, 1955, Scotty traded this guitar for a blonde-finish 1954 Gibson L-5 CESN, with which he recorded the last Sun sessions (including Mystery Train), as well as several RCA cuts, and in 1957 he switched to a Gibson Super 400. This Super 400 was the guitar heard on Jailhouse Rock, King Creole, as well as the earlier post-army sessions. 

One of the key pieces of equipment in Moore's sound on many of the recordings with Presley, besides his guitars, was the Ray Butts EchoSonic, first used by Chet Atkins, a guitar amplifier with a tape echo built in, which allowed him to take his trademark slapback echo on the road. It is important to note, however, that this amplifier was not used until 1955--which means that the earlier Sun sessions (including That's All Right Mama) were not recorded with this amplifier.

Last years and death
Moore had to give up playing guitar a few years before his death because of arthritis. Quite likely his last appearance on a recording came as a guest on the 2011 album 61 & 49 by the Mike Eldred Trio. That group's leader, guitarist Mike Eldred, had been a friend of Moore's since the early 1990s. As a member of Lee Rocker's Big Blue, Eldred also helped bring Moore (then semi-retired) aboard as a guest on that group's first album.

Moore died on June 28, 2016, in Nashville, Tennessee, at the age of 84.

Compositions
Scotty Moore co-wrote the songs "My Kind of Carrying On" and "Now She Cares No More" which were released as Sun 202 on Sun Records in 1954 when he was a member of the group Doug Poindexter and the Starlite Wranglers with Bill Black as the double bass player. He co-wrote the instrumental "Have Guitar Will Travel" in 1958 with Bill Black, which was released as a 45 single, 107, on the Fernwood Records label.

Awards
For his pioneering contribution, Moore has been recognized by the Rockabilly Hall of Fame. In 2000, he was inducted into the Rock and Roll Hall of Fame.

Bibliography

References

External links

ElvisInfoNet Interview with Scotty Moore 2001
SUN Records singles discography 
Interview with Scotty Moore

Interview with Scotty Moore for the NAMM Oral History Program July 18, 2002

1931 births
2016 deaths
People from Crockett County, Tennessee
American audio engineers
American rock guitarists
American rockabilly guitarists
American male guitarists
People from Tennessee
Sun Records artists
Lead guitarists
Fingerstyle guitarists
20th-century American guitarists
20th-century American male musicians
Elvis Presley